The Q and R class was a class of sixteen War Emergency Programme destroyers ordered for the British Royal Navy in 1940 as the 3rd and 4th Emergency Flotilla. They served as convoy escorts during World War II. Three Q-class ships were transferred to the Royal Australian Navy upon completion, with two further ships being handed over in 1945. Roebuck had the dubious honour of being launched prematurely by an air raid at Scotts shipyard in Greenock, her partially complete hulk lying submerged in the dockyard for nine months before it was salvaged and completed.

Design
The Q and R class were repeats of the preceding , but reverted to the larger J-, K- and N-class hull to allow for the inevitable growth in topweight. Like the O and Ps, they were armed with what weapons were available;  guns on single mountings that allowed for only 40° elevation - therefore do not compare favourably on paper with many contemporaries. These ships used the Fuze Keeping Clock HA Fire Control Computer.

In the Q class, 'Y' gun could be removed, allowing for the carriage of additional depth charges and projectors, or the carriage of minesweeps.

The R class were repeats of the Qs, except that the officers' accommodation was moved from its traditional location right aft to the more accessible location amidships. This facilitated the change in watchkeepers in inclement weather; the main deck of a destroyer would often be entirely awash in heavy seas, and catwalks were not fitted to connect fore and aft until the V class ordered in 1941.

In surviving ships, the single 20 mm Oerlikon guns in the bridge wings were later replaced by hydraulically operated Mark V twin mountings. Rotherham, Raider and Rocket later had the Oerlikons and searchlight amidships replaced by four single QF 40 mm Bofors. The searchlight was later reinstated at the cost of depth charge stowage. Raider only had an additional pair of twin Mark V Oerlikon mounts added on the after shelter deck. Radar Type 290 was replaced by Type 291, and later by Type 293 in some ships. The centimetric wavelength Type 272 set was added on a platform between the torpedo tubes in Rotherham, Racehorse, Rapid, Raider and Roebuck, or at the foremast truck in other ships. Racehorse, Raider, Rapid, Redoubt and Relentless had Huff-Duff (High-frequency Direction-finder) added on a lattice mainmast.

Ships

Q class

R class

Notes

References
 Destroyers of the Royal Navy, 1893–1981, Maurice Cocker, Ian Allan, 

 
 Conway's All the World's Fighting Ships 1922–1946, Ed. Robert Gardiner, Naval Institute Press, 
 Warships of Australia, Ross Gillett, Illustrations Colin Graham, Rigby Limited, 1977, 
 
 Royal Navy Destroyers since 1945, Leo Marriott, Ian Allan,

See also

 Type 15 frigate – most surviving Q and R-class ships were given this conversion post-war.

Destroyer classes
 
Ship classes of the Royal Navy